Harry Parr-Davies (24 May 1914 – 14 October 1955) was a Welsh composer and songwriter.

He was born Harry Parr Davies in Briton Ferry, Neath, South Wales educated at Neath Grammar School and was considered a musical prodigy, having composed whole operettas by the time he was in his teens. He came to the attention of composer Sir Walford Davies, who encouraged him to study music at Oxford or Cambridge. However his early professional success meant that this proposal was not pursued.  At the age of fourteen he had already composed six songs, and soon left Wales to expand upon his juvenile success.

In 1931, in an uncharacteristic moment of assertiveness, he talked his way into the dressing room of the singing star Gracie Fields at London's Winter Garden theatre.   From 1934, he worked as Fields' accompanist. He wrote songs for Jack Buchanan and Anna Neagle among others. His best-known songs included "Pedro the Fisherman", "Wish Me Luck as You Wave Me Goodbye" and "Sing as We Go".

He provided additional lyrics for Jan Peerce's best-selling recording of "Bluebird of Happiness" (music by Sandor Harmati, words by Edward Heyman).

In 1939 the show Black Velvet included Parr-Davies's song "Crash, Bang, I Want To Go Home". Other wartime shows which featured his work included Big Top, Happidrome (starring Tessie O'Shea), Full Swing, The Knight was Bold and The Lisbon Story. In the course of the war he was seconded from his regiment to join Gracie Fields in ENSA.

In 1944, his musical, Jenny Jones, which had a Welsh setting, was a flop, but it was followed by the successful revue Fine Feathers (1945), Her Excellency (1949) starring Cicely Courtneidge, and Dear Miss Phoebe (1950). He collaborated on the hit 1952 musical The Glorious Days, a vehicle for Anna Neagle.

Parr-Davies was at the peak of his success when he died on 14 October 1955 from an internal haemorrhage caused by a perforated ulcer for which, according to his sister, Billie David, he had declined to seek medical attention.   He died at his London home in Knightsbridge, but is buried beside his father and mother (whom he predeceased) in Oystermouth Cemetery near Swansea.

Songs by Parr-Davies used in George Formby films
"Bell Bottom George" (Park/Parr-Davies)
"If I Had a Girl Like You" (Park/Parr-Davies)
"In My Little Snapshot Album" (Harper/Haines/Parr-Davies)
"It's in the Air" (Parr-Davies)
"Noughts and Crosses" (Hunter/Parr-Davies)
"Swim Little Fish" (Park/Parr-Davies)
"Your Way Is My Way" (Parr-Davies)

References

External links
 

1914 births
1955 deaths
People from Briton Ferry
Welsh male songwriters
Welsh classical composers
Welsh male classical composers
Welsh musical theatre composers
People educated at Neath Grammar School for Boys
20th-century classical musicians
20th-century British composers
20th-century classical composers
20th-century British male musicians
20th-century British musicians
Deaths from ulcers